Schaefer–Bergmann diffraction is the resulting diffraction pattern of light interacting with sound waves in transparent crystals or glasses.

See also
 http://ieeexplore.ieee.org/xpl/freeabs_all.jsp?arnumber=1076617
 http://prola.aps.org/abstract/PR/v52/i3/p223_1
 DOI.org

References

Diffraction